The Line is a public art trail in London's East End, opened in 2015, that very roughly follows the path of the Greenwich meridian as it crosses the River Thames. It consists of a set of artworks positioned on a  walking route starting at the London Stadium, passing down the Lea Valley, crossing the Thames via the London Cable Car, and ending at The O2 in Greenwich. The trail includes works by Anthony Gormley and Tracey Emin.

List of artworks

Former works 
Several works were previously part of The Line, but have since been removed.

References

External links
 

Art exhibitions in London
Footpaths in London
2015 establishments
Line
Line
Tourist attractions in the London Borough of Newham
Tourist attractions in the Royal Borough of Greenwich